Cigánd SE is a Hungarian football club based in Cigánd, Hungary.They play their home games at the Cigándi Sportpálya.

Season results
As of 6 August 2017

References

Football clubs in Hungary